AGBU Manoogian-Demirdjian School is an Armenian-American private school located in Winnetka, Los Angeles, California, United States. Located in the heart of the San Fernando Valley, it was founded in 1976 as Saint Peter-AGBU School near the corner of Louise Avenue and Sherman Way on the grounds of Saint Peter Armenian Apostolic Church.

Initially there were 19 students and a staff of three teachers. It is run by the Armenian General Benevolent Union and privately financed through student tuitions, donors, world class fundraising events, cutting edge sporting venues, etc. With about 680 students, it is the second smallest Armenian private school in the Greater Los Angeles area. The school was founded in 1976 and has been accredited by WASC since 1990. Instruction is in Armenian and British English. In 2006, the AGBU established an Armenian satellite high school in Pasadena to serve that city's Armenian community.

History
Since its founding in 1906, the Armenian General Benevolent Union has recognized the role of education in the preservation of the Armenian people and the Armenian cultural heritage establishing, funding and operating hundreds of schools in historic Armenia in the pre-1915 period and in the Diaspora after the 1920s.

As the Armenian community increased in southern California during the quarter century after World War II, so did the need for Armenian schools. In 1975, AGBU Life President Mr. Alex Manoogian approved the proposal to establish an AGBU-sponsored school in southern California. A group of individuals representing the AGBU and St. Peter Armenian Apostolic Church formed a committee to lay the foundations of the new school, which opened its doors on the grounds of St. Peter Church in February 1976 with an enrollment of nineteen students and three teachers.

By 1980, student enrollment had increased to 129, Preschool through 6th grade, and the faculty to eleven. In June 1981, the school awarded Elementary School diplomas to its first graduating class of ten students. Student enrollment jumped to 230 the following year and Middle School grades were added.

The physical capacity of the school next to St. Peter Church was no longer able to accommodate the increasing student population, nor could it meet the program requirements of a Middle School level school. This challenge was met by the rental of a vacant public school facility from LAUSD, located at the west end of Canoga Park, and the school moved there for the 1982-1983 academic year.

As enrollment continued to increase, reaching 300 students in 1985, the search for a permanent school facility was initiated, once again enjoying the encouragement of Mr. Alex Manoogian. A closed-down public school in Canoga Park with a more centrally-located location was available for sale in early 1986.

Mr. Alex Manoogian pledged two million dollars, provided the remaining one million would be raised by the community. This was achieved with the purchase of the 6.3 acre school complex, located at 6844 Oakdale Avenue, Canoga Park. The school moved to its permanent campus on July 1, 1986.

In September 1986, the 11th academic year of St. Peter-AGBU School opened with 414 students as a complete Preschool and Elementary through High School educational institution, about to send its first graduates to college.

In recognition of Mr. Alex Manoogian's leadership and contributions that made this milestone possible, in February, 1987 the Board of Trustees renamed the school as AGBU Marie Manoogian School, in honor of Mr. Manoogian's spouse, Mrs. Marie Manoogian.

The seven students of the first graduating senior class were awarded High School diplomas in June, 1987, and were followed by classes of 8, 11, 18, 24 and 30 graduates between 1987 and 1992.

The Board of Trustees and the Building Committee began to consider options available to expand the physical capacity of the school. Once again Mr. Alex Manoogian pledged finance and commissioned Detroit architect Mr. Osep Sarraf to come up with a conceptual design. It consisted of a high school building of twenty classrooms, labs and faculty rooms; a gymnasium-multi-purpose hall and cafeteria structure; and subterranean and surface parking for 200 cars.

Mr. Sarraf's design was developed into working drawings by the architectural firm of Morris Verger and Associates. Construction of the project began on December 29, 1991.

Philanthropists Mr. & Mrs. Sarkis and Seta Demirdjian of Lebanon made a donation of $1.25 million which, when added to the original construction fund capital of $2.5 million donated by Mr. Alex Manoogian, was sufficient to bring the high school and parking phase of the expansion project to completion before school reopened in September, 1992. In recognition of the donation of the Demirdjians, the middle and upper school division was renamed as Sarkis and Seta Demirdjian High School.

In May 1992, the school received full accreditation by the Western Association of Schools and Colleges (WASC).

The last phase of the expansion project, the gymnasium-cafeteria complex, was completed a year later thanks to the one million dollar donation by AGBU donors the Nazarian brothers, Nazar, Noubar and Garbis, of New Jersey and Lebanon.

During the following years, the school went through two expansions. The Elementary division was enlarged by a six-classroom building to accommodate small class sizes in 1997 and the High School building was enlarged by the construction of the Sinanian Annex in 2006, adding nine classrooms and a faculty lounge to that facility.

In 1996, the school celebrated its 20th anniversary and a permanent School Endowment Fund was established through the donation of $100,000 by the Manoogian Family and the fundraising efforts of the Parent Teacher Organization, which raised an additional $100,000. The Endowment Fund stands at $752,745.

The year 2001 marked the Silver Anniversary of the establishment of the school. By then, the school had over 500 high school graduates and enrollment stood at 950 students.

The 30th anniversary in 2006 was the occasion of a fund-raising effort for a new addition to the Preschool facilities. The project was completed during the following year in the presence of major donors Mr. and Mrs. Nazar and Artemis Nazarian and the Preschool was renamed as AGBU Artemis Nazarian Preschool.

The school's 35th anniversary was celebrated in 2011. Thanks to a fund raising effort, all classrooms are equipped with SMART Boards, in addition to Elmo projector units and computers. A project nearing completion will instal an internal fiber optics network. This will enable the use of a school-wide, high speed network for high speed Internet access.

The school has graduated several seniors with perfect SAT scores, as AP National Scholars and National Merit Scholars. AGBU MDS students have enrolled as freshmen at all University of California campuses, private and public universities in California and other states, and Ivy League schools like Harvard University, Brown University, Cornell University and UPenn. AGBU MDS alumni have been enrolled in institutions of higher learning in the United States to pursue degrees, graduate and post graduate studies.

2011-2012 marks the 36th academic year of AGBU Manoogian-Demirdjian School.

Athletics
The AGBUMDS Titans have been competitive in the SFVPSL and CIF athletic programs. The boys Varsity soccer team has won back-to-back CIF International league Championships from 2004 to 2009 under coach Tigran Ekimian. The boys varsity flag football team became champions with an undefeated 13-0 record in 2016 under coach Jack Keshishian. The varsity flag football team would also win the 2019 championship going 14-0.

See also
 History of the Armenian Americans in Los Angeles

External links
 Official website

1976 establishments in California
Armenian-American culture in Los Angeles
Armenian-American private schools
Armenian General Benevolent Union
Educational institutions established in 1976
Private K-12 schools in Los Angeles County, California
High schools in the San Fernando Valley
Winnetka, Los Angeles